Mastung, the capital of Mastung District, is a town in the Balochistan province of Pakistan. It is located at 29°48'0N 66°50'60E and has an altitude of 1701 metres (5583 feet). The town is also the administrative centre of Mastung Tehsil, an administrative subdivision of the district – the town itself is administratively subdivided into two Union Councils.

Mastung is located in Sarawan which is a division of the princely state of Kalat, the Chief Of Sarawan himself is from Mastung.

History
Mastung was known to the 10th-century geographers al-Muqaddasi and Istakhri, who both listed it among the towns in the province of Bālis, also called Bālish or Wālishtān, whose capital was Sibi.

The Ain-i-Akbari, written during the reign of the Mughal emperor Akbar in the late 1500s, lists Mastung as one of the 24 mahals included in the Sarkar of Kandahar. At that time, Mastung was defended by a mud brick fort and produced a yearly revenue of 10 tumans and 8,000 dinars in cash alongside 470 kharwars of grain. Its population was a mixture of Afghans and Balochs.

The 2017 Mastung suicide bombing killed 28 and injured 40. A 2018 suicide bombing killed 149 and injured 186.

Demography 
There are numerous Baloch as well as Pashtun tribes populated in Mastung, the tribes include Bangulzai, Shahwani, Pirkani, Sarpara, Raisani (Tareen) and Muhammad Shahi, which are the most common tribes and are politically active and leading in the area other tribes include Dehwar, Lehri, Satakzai, Bangulzai, Tareen, Ali Zai and several more.

Religion

Languages

Like other Balochistan major urban centers such as Quetta, Sibi, Mach, and Khuzdar, it is a multi-ethnic city where several languages are spoken including Brahui, Persian (Dehwari dialects), Pashto, Baluchi, Sindhi (In Hindki and Frakhi dialects) and Urdu. No language has a clear majority and Urdu serves as lingua franca for inter-ethnic communications.

See also
 Mastung Valley
 Khwaja Ibrahim Yukpasi
 Baluchistan Agency

Notes

References

Populated places in Mastung District